Mittelsachsen is an electoral constituency (German: Wahlkreis) represented in the Bundestag. It elects one member via first-past-the-post voting. Under the current constituency numbering system, it is designated as constituency 161. It is located in central Saxony, comprising most of the Mittelsachsen district.

Mittelsachsen was created for the 2009 federal election. Since 2021, it has been represented by Carolin Bachmann of the Alternative for Germany (AfD).

Geography
Mittelsachsen is located in central Saxony. As of the 2021 federal election, it comprises the entirety of the Mittelsachsen district excluding the municipalities of Claußnitz, Erlau, Geringswalde, Hartmannsdorf, Königshain-Wiederau, Lichtenau, Lunzenau, Penig, and Wechselburg and the Verwaltungsgemeinschaften of Burgstädt and Rochlitz.

History
Mittelsachsen was created in 2009 and contained parts of the abolished constituencies of Döbeln – Mittweida – Meißen II and Freiberg – Mittlerer Erzgebirgskreis. In the 2009 election, it was constituency 162 in the numbering system. Since 2013, it has been number 161. Its borders have not changed since its creation.

Members
The constituency was first represented by Veronika Bellmann of the Christian Democratic Union (CDU) from 2009 to 2021. It was won by Carolin Bachmann of the Alternative for Germany (AfD) in 2021.

Election results

2021 election

2017 election

2013 election

2009 election

References

Federal electoral districts in Saxony
2009 establishments in Germany
Constituencies established in 2009
Mittelsachsen